Archinotodelphyidae is a family of copepods belonging to the order Cyclopoida.

Genera:
 Archinotodelphys Lang, 1949
 Pararchinotodelphys Lang, 1949

References

Cyclopoida